Bebe, Bébé, or BeBe is a given name and a nickname which may refer to:

People

Given name
 Bebe Bryans (born 1957), United States national rowing champion and former coach
 Bebe Moore Campbell (1950–2006), American author, journalist and teacher
 Bèbè Kambou (born 1982), Burkinabé footballer
 Bebe Nanaki (c. 1464–1518), elder sister and first follower of Guru Nanak, the founder and first Guru of Sikhism
 Bebe Patten (1913-2004), American Christian evangelist
 Bebe Sweetbriar (born 1962), American drag singer, actor, community activist, and host

Nickname
 Mary Anderson (actress, born 1918) (1918–2014), American film and television actress
 Bebe Barron (1925–2008), American electronic music pioneer
 Christian Bérard (1902–1949), known as Bebè, French artist, fashion illustrator and designer
 Bebe Brătianu (1887–1955/56), liberal Romanian politician
 Bebe Buell (born 1953), American model, singer and Playboy Playmate of the Month
 Bebe Cave (born 1997), English actress
 Bebe Daniels (1901–1971), American actress, singer, dancer, and producer
 Nicolas Ferry (1741–1764), known as "Bébé", court dwarf of Polish King Stanisław Leszczyński
 Bebe Neuwirth (born 1958), American theater, television, and film actress
 Lucas Nogueira (born 1992), basketball player for the Toronto Raptors, known by the name "Bebê
 Roberto Pannunzi (born 1948 or 1946), Italian drug trafficker
 Bebe Pham, Vietnamese model and actress born Phạm Thị Thúy (born 1983)
 Bebe Rebozo (1912–1998), American banker and businessman
 Bebe Rexha (born 1989) American singer and songwriter
 BeBe Shopp (born 1930), Miss America in 1948
 Beatrice Vio (born 1997), Italian wheelchair fencer
 BeBe Winans (born 1962), American gospel and R&B singer
 Bebe Wood (born 2001), American actress

Fictional characters
 Bebe Glazer, in the American sitcom Frasier
 Bebe Stevens, in the animated television series South Park
 Bebe, in the Japanese anime television series Puella Magi Madoka Magica

Hypocorisms
Lists of people by nickname